Simas Bertašius (born 31 October 1993 in Raseiniai) is a Lithuanian middle-distance runner competing primarily in the 1500 metres. His best result is the sixth place at the 2018 European Championships in Berlin.

International competitions

Personal bests
Outdoor
800 metres – 1:48.48 (Valmiera 2021)
1000 metres – 2:21.11 (Pärnu 2018)
1500 metres – 3:37.38 (Sotteville-lès-Rouen 2021) NR 
Mile run – 3:59.25 (Vilnius 2020) NR
3000 metres – 7:57.75 (Birmingham 2018)
5000 metres – 13:57.94 (Palanga 2018)
Indoor
800 metres – 1:51.69 (Kaunas 2020)
1000 metres – 2:24.49 (Vilnius 2018)
1500 metres – 3:38.32 (Ostrava 2022) NR 
3000 metres – 8:12.26 (Klaipeda 2018)

References

1993 births
Living people
Lithuanian male middle-distance runners
People from Raseiniai